Parahancornia peruviana is a species of tree in the family Apocynaceae. It is native to South America.

References

Trees of Peru